Stojanče "Stole" Stoilov (born 30 April 1987) is a Macedonian handball player for RK Vardar 1961 and the  Macedonian national team.

Honours

Domestic competitions
 Macedonian Handball Super League:
 Winner: 2007–08, 2009–10, 2012–13, 2014–15, 2015–16, 2016–17, 2017–18, 2018-19, 2020-21, 2021-22

 Macedonian Handball Cup:
 Winner: 2009, 2010, 2012, 2014, 2015, 2016, 2017, 2018, 2021, 2022

European competitions
 EHF Champions League
 Winner: 2016–17, 2018–19

Other competitions
 SEHA League:
 Winner: 2011–12, 2013–14, 2016–17, 2017–18, 2018–19

References

External links

1987 births
Living people
Macedonian male handball players
Sportspeople from Skopje
Macedonian expatriate sportspeople in Romania
Expatriate handball players
RK Vardar players